The Cardiff Fire 2 were an ice hockey team based in Cardiff, Wales. They 
played in the NIHL 2 South West Division. The Cardiff Fire 2 are a minor league affiliate of the Cardiff Devils of the Elite Ice Hockey League, and Cardiff Fire of the NIHL 1 South Division.

Season-by-season record

Club roster 2020–21

2020/21 Outgoing

References 

Ice hockey teams in Wales
Sport in Cardiff
Ice hockey clubs established in 2015
2015 establishments in Wales